Tatary, or Tartary, was a historical region of Asia.

Crim Tatary is an archaic English expression for Crimea or the Crimean Khanate.

Tatary may also refer to the following Tatar villages:
Tatary, Greater Poland Voivodeship (west-central Poland)
Tatary, Masovian Voivodeship (east-central Poland)
Tatary, Podlaskie Voivodeship (north-east Poland)
Tatary, Gołdap County in Warmian-Masurian Voivodeship (north Poland)
Tatary, Nidzica County in Warmian-Masurian Voivodeship (north Poland)